Better Motörhead than Dead: Live at Hammersmith is the ninth live album by the band Motörhead, and is the entire concert of their 30th anniversary show at the Hammersmith Apollo in London on 16 June 2005. It was released on 16 July, 2007, on Steamhammer as a double CD, and is the third live album, tenth album in total, with the label.

Recording
Motörhead have always stated that they are a touring band, which has kept them on their feet a lot more than record sales ever did; especially over the mid 1980s to the mid 1990s, when they had massive label issues, from 1984 to 1994 specifically. The lineup of Lemmy, Zoom and Mikkey (on this album) has been the most consistent one, since Würzel left the band. Mikkey Dee joined in 1992 during the end of making the March or Die album – 14 years prior to this album, and at this point equalling Phil "Philthy Animal" Taylor's time on the drums – whilst Phil "Zööm" Campbell joined in 1984, with Michael "Würzel" Burston, and never left the band.

When it comes to the Motörhead that most people since the early 1990s have seen live, this is it.

Some critics have used their forums, such as Allmusic and Blabbermouth, to point out that by this stage Motörhead seemed to be churning out live albums. But this can be expected from a band that has lived on the road, and finally got some respect.

The band seem to have been trying to make up for the many years of missing out on good, quality, live material put out to the public. Since their seminal No.#1 UK hit album, No Sleep 'til Hammersmith, was released they have struggled match it, as 1988s follow up album, Nö Sleep at All, was not nearly as good in record sales. It would be over a decade until the next live album, Everything Louder Than Everyone Else in 1999, recorded in 1998 in Germany, was released to the public, and it was quickly followed by Live at Brixton Academy in 2003, their 25th anniversary concert from 2000. So this album is putting out a statement that they have always wanted to do good by the fans, but haven't had the label to back them, until signing with Steamhammer.

Release
"Love Me Like A Reptile", "Shoot You In The Back", "Over The Top" and "(We Are) The Road Crew", all off the Ace of Spades album, haven't been played live in more than a decade, let alone make the live album release, even if they found a place in some random setlist over the years. The album title song "Iron Fist", which once opened the set, gets a reprise. "I Got Mine" and "Dancing On Your Grave" haven't been played since the Brian "Robbo" Robertson days on their accompanying tour for Another Perfect Day back in the early eighties, and haven't seen the light of day until this recording.

"Dr Rock", also a set opener for years, gets a run from Orgasmatron, and the 'big hit' "Killed by Death", from the No Remorse compilation, both reflecting the Pete Gill days in the band. The once live twin solo jam track, "Just 'Cos You Got The Power" from the Eat The Rich single, hasn't been heard in a very long time and is a homage to late Würzel's days in the band. "Going to Brazil", also once a set opener (they have quite a few on this album) and "R.A.M.O.N.E.S.", from the last time Philthy had anything to do with band, both of the 1916 album.

The rest of the set has the regular show stoppers and plays some new track also, to round out a balanced list of songs over the band's career.

Critical reception
It got a standard reception when it was released, as with the previous live album, which was also their 25th anniversary show, and also a double CD, with a similar amount of fanfare, that being not much.

AllMusic's Greg Prato writes:

Whilst Blabbermouths's Scott Alisoglu states:

And Amazon said:

Track listing

Personnel
Adapted from the liner notes.

Motörhead
 Lemmy – lead vocals, bass, harmonica and acoustic guitar on "Whorehouse Blues"
 Phil Campbell – lead guitar, acoustic guitar on "Whorehouse Blues"
 Mikkey Dee – drums, acoustic guitar on "Whorehouse Blues"

Production
Cameron Webb – producer
Motörhead –  executive producers

References

Motörhead live albums
2007 live albums
SPV/Steamhammer live albums